David Meese (25 December 1723 – 23 August 1770) was a Dutch botanist notable for his authorship of the Flora frisica in 1760.

Career
Born into a low class family, Meese became a self taught herbalist. His skills were recognized by the University of Franeker where he was placed in charge of the academic gardens at the college in 1752.

In 1760, Meese published a flora of Friesland, the Flora frisica, which followed the Linnaean system of classification. He followed this with the publication of the two-part Plantarum rudimenta etc. in 1763, written in both Latin and Dutch. He was known for his experiments into moss physiology. He investigated the propagation of the common hair moss, Polytrichum commune, and was among the first to write an account on the morphology of spore germination.

Among his inventions was a special seeder, which was a wooden cart with two wheels with holes back wall to allow seed to pass through. He also invented a seed drill.

The moss genus Meesia was named after him in 1788 by his contemporary Johann Hedwig.

Publications

References

1723 births
1770 deaths
Botanical writers
18th-century Dutch botanists
Bryologists
Dutch bryologists
People from Leeuwarden